Thor Lake Aerodrome, formerly , was located next to Thor Lake, Northwest Territories, Canada.

References

Defunct airports in the Northwest Territories